Iranian passports, also known as Persian passports, are issued to nationals of Iran for the purpose of international travel. The passport serves as a proof of Iranian citizenship. The Iranian passports are burgundy, with the Iranian emblem emblazoned on the top of the front cover.

The words "" (Persian) meaning Islamic Republic of Iran and "" (Persian) meaning passport are inscribed to the right side of the coat of arms. Iran started issuing diplomatic and service biometric passports in July 2007. Ordinary biometric passports began to be issued on 20 February 2011. These passports contain 32 pages.

On the inside of the back-cover, Iranian passports bear the inscription: "The holder of this passport is not entitled to travel to occupied Palestine", referring to Israel.

In the past, prior to the 1979 Islamic Revolution, passports issued by Pahlavi Iran were visually different, with the inscription "Empire of Iran" being used, and translations into French rather than English.

Identity information page
The Iranian passport includes the following data:
 Holder's signature / امضا دارنده گذرنامه
 Country of residence / کشور محل اقامت
 Place of Issue / محل صدور پاسپورت (The exact place of the passport's issuance. e.g. 'Yerevan' if it's issued outside of the country, or 'Immigration and Passport Police' if it have been issued inside)
 مدرک صدور گذرنامه (an Eight Digit Code showing the Passport's number)
 Name & Position of Issuing Authority (or, in the older passports, "Name & Position of Issuing Officer) / نام و سمت صادر کننده
 ملاحظات (Does not exist in the Passports that have issued within the country borders. It states the last exact time of exiting Iran legally.)
 Type ('P' for passport)
 Country Code (IRN)
 Passport No. (in older passports: "Passport Number")
 شماره ملی (National ID number)
 Surname / نام خانوادگی
 Name / نام
 Father's Name / نام پدر
 Date & Place of Birth / تاریخ و محل تولد (Example: 1970-01-01 - TEHRAN or ۱۳۴۸/۱۰/۱۱ - تهران)
 Sex / جنسیت (M/مرد for male, F/زن for female)
 Date of Issue / تاریخ صدور
 Date of Expiry / تاریخ انقضا
 شماره شناسنامه (Either, the old Birth Certificate number (for those who have born before 1990), or a repetition of the National ID number.)

Passport number
The passport number is the serial number that uniquely identifies a passport. The passport number changes every time a person has issued a new passport, with the previous passport number noted in an endorsement on the last page of the new passport.

The passport number is alphanumeric, with a letter followed by an eight-digit number, e.g. A00000000.
In the Persian letters on top of the passport, the passport number does not have the first English letter.

Identity Number
The national identity number for Iranians is a unique 10-digit number allocated to each citizen of Iran; & it is used widely for identity confirmation in many places.
The unique number is in the following format:

 XXX-YYYYYY-C
 The first three digits are the numeric code indicating the state of birth.
 The next six digits are randomly generated numbers
 And the last digit is known as the Check or Control Number.
The control number is calculated from the previous 9 digits and verifies if the ID number is valid.

Languages
For each item in the passport, captions are provided in Persian and nearly all of them are also provided in English.

Restrictions on travel
As Iran (the Islamic Republic of) does not recognize or have diplomatic relations with the state of Israel (like some other Muslim countries), people using an Iranian passport are not permitted to travel to Israel under Iranian law (although Israel itself does admit Iranian citizens holding a visa).
On the inside of the back-cover, Iranian passports bear the inscription: "The holder of this passport is not entitled to travel to occupied Palestine", referring to Israel.

Visa requirements for Iranian citizens

As of February 2020, Iranian citizens had visa-free or visa on arrival access to 41 countries and territories, ranking the Iranian passport 98th in terms of travel freedom (tied with passports from Bangladesh, Dem. Rep. of Congo and Eritrea) according to the Henley Passport Index.

 Iranians were also temporarily denied admission by former US President Donald Trump in early 2017 as part of the Trump travel ban. Exemptions for academic visas and waivers from consular officials were eventually allowed before being lifted in its entirety by Trump's successor Joe Biden upon assuming office in 2021.

History

The first Persian passport was issued during the reign of Nasereddin Shah around 1885. It used to be called 'Tazkereh-ye Safar' (Travel Document) and the text was entirely in Persian. 
During the reign of Ahmad Shah (early 20th-century) the French titles were added to the document "Passeport du passage: au nom de Sa Majeste Imperiale le Shahinschah de Perse" (Passport of the Passage: in the name of His Imperial Majesty the Shahanshah of Persia). After 1935 the title was changed to "Empire de l'Iran".

Gallery of historic images

See also
Iranian national identity card
Visa requirements for Iranian citizens
Visa policy of Iran
Iranian nationality law
Identity documents in Iran
List of passports

References

External links 
Ministry of Foreign Affairs of Iran
Iranian Interests Section at Pakistani Embassy (Washington D.C.) 

Passports by country
Identity documents of Iran